Mount Justman is a mountain  high along the edge of the Ross Ice Shelf in Antarctica, standing in the northern part of the Gabbro Hills, midway between Olliver Peak and Mount Roth. It was named by the Advisory Committee on Antarctic Names for Lieutenant Commander L.G. Justman, U.S. Navy, Assistant Ship Operations Officer on the Staff of the Commander, U.S. Naval Support Force, Antarctica, 1964.

References

Mountains of the Ross Dependency
Dufek Coast